Browallia americana, the Jamaican forget-me-not, amethyst flower, or bush violet, is a species of flowering plant. It is native to tropical Latin America, from Mexico and the Caribbean, south to Peru and Brazil. Forms are variable. Pictured is the broader-leaved form.

References 

Cestroideae
Plants described in 1753
Taxa named by Carl Linnaeus